Franciszek Zastawniak (13 August 1905 – 16 November 1966) was a Polish footballer. He played in two matches for the Poland national football team from 1927 to 1928.

References

External links
 

1905 births
1966 deaths
Polish footballers
Poland international footballers
Association footballers not categorized by position